The Great Rock 'n' Roll Swindle is a novel by Michael Moorcock published in 1980.

Plot summary
The Great Rock 'n' Roll Swindle is a novel in which Jerry Cornelius and the Sex Pistols bring anarchy to the UK.

Reception
Greg Costikyan reviewed The Great Rock n Roll Swindle in Ares Magazine #12 and commented that "There are some amusing moments in Swindle [...] especially when Bakunin and the Ukrainian anarchist Makhno criticize the hedonistic decadence of what punkers claim is 'anarchy.'"

Reviews
Review by Richard E. Geis (1980) in Science Fiction Review, August 1980
Review by Joseph Nicholas (1981) in Paperback Inferno, Volume 4, Number 5

References

1980 British novels
Novels by Michael Moorcock
Virgin Books books